African Queens origins are uncertain. She was a foreign vessel, launched in 1789 or 1790, presumably under another name. She was taken in prize in 1796 and by 1797 she was sailing out of Bristol. She made one voyage to Africa during which she was captured and recaptured and then became a slave ship. She made one voyage to the West Indies as a merchant ship, and one voyage as a whaler, but was damaged in 1801 as she returned home from that whaling voyage and apparently never sailed again.

Career
African Queen first appeared in Lloyd's Register (LR) in 1797 with R. Buckle, master, T. King, owner, and trade Bristol–Africa. She had undergone small repairs in 1796.

Africa voyage: African Queen, Buckle, master, sailed from Bristol on 27 February 1797. African Queen, Buckle, master, was taken on the Windward Coast as she was sailing from Africa to Bristol, of Liverpool, with 350 slaves, and African Queen, of Bristol, Buckle, master, were retaken. African Queen had been on a direct voyage (for wood, ivory, and palm oil for Britain), not gathering slaves for the West Indies.

Slave voyage: Rather than returning to Bristol, African Queen commenced slave trading. She gathered her slaves at Cape Coast Castle. She arrived at Demerara on 7 June 1798. She arrived with 313 slaves and she landed 49 at Demerara. She then sailed to St Vincent, where she arrived on 26 June, and landed the remaining 264. She returned to Bristol on 18 September.

Merchant voyage: In March 1799 African Queen, Sands, master, was at Cork, having come from Bristol. In May she was reported to have arrived at Barbados. By January 1800 African Queen, Cook, master, was back at Cork, having come from Lisbon.

Whaling voyage: Although some sources report that African Queen made a whaling voyage to the Brazil Banks under the command of R. Buckle, it is clear from the above information that she went slaving instead. However, in 1800 African Queen, Benjamin Cook, master, did go whaling to the Brazil Banks.

While outward bound African Queen lost two boats and five men in a storm near Trinidad. In April 1800 she stopped at Rio de Janeiro to get sailors, and wood to replace the lost boats. 

In May 1801 it was reported that African Queen was wintering in South Georgia. On 19 September 1801 African Queen was at Saint Helena on her way back to Bristol from the South Seas.

Fate
By one account, African Queen had returned to Bristol in November 1801. However, Lloyd's List reported on 8 December 1801 that African Queen, Cook, master, was on shore in the Bristol Channel and full of water. She had been returning to Bristol from the South Seas. African Queen was later refloated and taken in to Newport, Monmouthshire.

African Queen was valued at £6,500 in 1802, and was listed in Lloyd's Register until 1804 with B. Cook, master, Anderson, owner, and trade Bristol–Barbados. However, she did not appear in Lloyd's Lists SAD data after December 1801.

Notes

Citations

References
 
 

1790s ships
Captured ships
Bristol slave ships
Age of Sail merchant ships of England
Whaling ships
Maritime incidents in 1801
Shipwrecks of England